A Paris Education is a 2018 French drama film directed by Jean-Paul Civeyrac. It was screened in the Panorama section at the 68th Berlin International Film Festival.

Cast
 Andranic Manet as Etienne
 Diane Rouxel as Lucie
 Jenna Thiam as Valentina
 Gonzague Van Bervesseles as Jean-Noël
 Corentin Fila as Mathias

References

External links
 

2018 films
2018 drama films
French drama films
2010s French-language films
2010s French films